Elias P. Bailey was a member of the Wisconsin State Assembly.

Biography
Bailey was born on December 17, 1832, in Irasburg, Vermont. He married Lucinda A. McCarty. They would have four children. Bailey died on October 16, 1881.

Career
Bailey was a member of the Assembly during the 1872 session. Additionally, he was Chairman (similar to Mayor), Treasurer and Assessor of Lucas, Wisconsin. He was a Republican.

References

External links

People from Orleans County, Vermont
People from Dunn County, Wisconsin
Republican Party members of the Wisconsin State Assembly
Mayors of places in Wisconsin
City and town treasurers in the United States
1832 births
1881 deaths
Burials in Wisconsin
19th-century American politicians